Viking Apocalypse is a TV program on the National Geographic Channel. The show examines the Ridgeway Hill Viking burial pit in Weymouth, UK, a site of a suspected mass execution long ago. As they begin digging, archaeologists discover many male Viking skulls and search for clues that may reveal why Weymouth would have been a site for these beheadings.

References

National Geographic (American TV channel) original programming